Časlav Đorđević (Serbian Cyrillic: Часлав Ђорђевић; born 16 February 1942) is a Serbian writer and a member of the Association of Writers of Serbia. He has written literary critiques and essays, and compiled anthologies of Serbian poetry. He is the author of two books of poetry, and a contributor to literary journals.

References

1942 births
Living people
People from Bujanovac
Serbian male poets
Serbian male essayists
Serbian literary critics
Literary critics of Serbian
Serbian writers